Daral Lake also known Daral Dand is an alpine scenic lake in the hill top of Bahrain a region of Swat Valley in Khyber Pakhtunkhwa the Province of Pakistan. It is situated to the northeast of Saidgai Lake. The lake appears as giant amoeba like in shape and stretched over a huge area. Near the lake, there is an ancient mosque where shepherds and visitors offer their prayers and use it as a resting place for night.

Location and physical features 

Daral Dand is situated in the western upper reaches of Bahrain, in the foothills of Spinsar Mountain and to the northeast of Saidgai Dand at an elevation of 3,505.2 m (11,500 ft). The lake is fed by melting glaciers of the surrounding mountains and gives rise to Daral Khwar which is the main left tributary of Swat River.

Access 
Daral Lake is accessible only during the summer; during the winter, the trails which lead to the lake, are closed due to heavy snowfall. While in summer, it can be accessed from Bahrain in three to four hours of trekking on bare mountains, after which the trek descends down towards the East where Daral Lake is located. Alternatively, it can be approached from Gabina Jabba hill top, the most favoured trail. An unmetalled-cum-jeepable road ends at Gabina Jabba where the trekking journey begins. From here, continuous trekking for almost 4–5 hours leads to the lake.

See also 
Lake Saiful Muluk - Kaghan Valley
Dudipatsar Lake - Kaghan Valley
Saidgai Lake - Swat Valley
Mahodand Lake - Kalam Valley
Kundol Lake - Kalam Valley

References 

Tourist attractions in Swat
Lakes of Khyber Pakhtunkhwa
Swat District
Swat Kohistan